Arthur Cullin was a British actor of the silent era who was born in Kensington, London. He is often credited as Arthur M. Cullin.

Selected filmography
 The Answer (1916)
 The Valley of Fear (1916)
 Whoso Is Without Sin (1916)
 Disraeli (1916)
 A Romany Lass (1918)
 Nature's Gentleman (1918)
 A Smart Set (1919)
 The Flame (1920)
 The Yellow Claw (1921)
 Blood Money (1921)
 The Mystery Road (1921)
 Dangerous Lies (1921)
 The Sign of Four (1923)
 Fires of Fate (1923)
 The Desert Sheik (1924)

References

External links
 

Year of birth unknown
Year of death unknown
English male film actors
English male silent film actors
Male actors from London
People from Kensington
20th-century English male actors